The Shadow Cabinets appointed by Michael Howard, a Conservative, are listed below.

Shadow Cabinet (11 November 2003 – 15 March 2004)
Rt. Hon. Michael Howard QC MP – Leader of Her Majesty's Loyal Opposition and Leader of the Conservative Party
Rt. Hon. Michael Ancram QC MP – Deputy Leader of the Conservative Party, Shadow Foreign Secretary and Shadow Secretary of State for International Affairs
Rt. Hon. Oliver Letwin MP – Shadow Chancellor of the Exchequer and Shadow Secretary of State for Economic Affairs
Rt. Hon. David Davis MP – Shadow Home Secretary and Shadow Secretary of State for Home, Constitutional and Legal Affairs
Dr. Liam Fox MP and Rt. Hon. Maurice Saatchi, Lord Saatchi – Chairman of the Conservative Party
Tim Yeo MP – Shadow Secretary of State for Public Services, Education and Health
Rt. Hon. Theresa May MP – Shadow Secretary of State for Environment and Transport
Rt. Hon. Thomas Galbraith, Lord Strathclyde PC – Shadow Leader of the House of Lords
Rt. Hon. David Curry MP – Shadow Secretary of State for Local and Devolved Government Affairs
David Willetts MP – Head of policy co-ordination and Shadow Secretary of State for Work and Pensions, Economic Affairs
Rt. Hon. David Maclean MP – Opposition Chief Whip

Junior Shadow Ministers
Hon. Nicholas Soames MP – Shadow Secretary of State for Defence, International Affairs
John Bercow MP – Shadow Secretary of State for International Development, International Affairs
Rt. Hon. James Arbuthnot MP – [[Shadow Secretary of State for Business and Industrial Strategy/Economic Affairs
Howard Flight MP – Shadow Chief Secretary to the Treasury, Economic Affairs
Stephen O'Brien MP – Shadow Secretary of State for Industry, Economic Affairs
Dominic Grieve MP – Attorney General, Home, Constitutional and Legal Affairs
Tim Collins CBE MP – Shadow Secretary of State for Education and Skills, Public Services, Education and Health
Eric Pickles MP – Shadow Secretary of State for Local Government, Local and Devolved Government Affairs
Alan Duncan MP – Shadow Secretary of State for Constitutional Affairs, Home, Constitutional and Legal Affairs
Julie Kirkbride MP – Secretary of State for Culture, Media and Sport, Home, Constitutional and Legal Affairs
Andrew Lansley MP – Shadow Secretary of State for Health, Public Services, Education and Health
Caroline Spelman MP – Shadow Secretary of State for the Environment and Shadow Minister for Women, Environment and Transport
Damian Green MP – Shadow Secretary of State for Transport, Environment and Transport
John Whittingdale MP – Shadow Secretary of State for Agriculture, Fisheries and Food, Environment and Transport
Oliver Heald MP – Shadow Leader of the House of Commons
Hon. Bernard Jenkin MP – Shadow Secretary of State for the Regions, Local and Devolved Government Affairs
David Lidington MP – Shadow Secretary of State for Northern Ireland, Local and Devolved Government Affairs
Bill Wiggin MP – Shadow Secretary of State for Wales, Local and Devolved Government Affairs
Peter Duncan MP – Shadow Secretary of State for Scotland, Local and Devolved Government Affairs
Christopher Prout, Lord Kingsland QC – Shadow Lord Chancellor, Home, Constitutional and Legal Affairs
Andrew Tyrie MP – Shadow Financial Secretary to the Treasury

Michael Howard Shadow Cabinet reshuffle, 15 March 2004
There was a minor reshuffle of the Shadow Cabinet due to the stepping down of Rt. Hon. David Curry MP as Shadow Secretary of State for Local and Devolved Government Affairs

Shadow Cabinet (15 March 2004 – 14 June 2004)
Rt. Hon. Michael Howard QC MP – Leader of Her Majesty's Loyal Opposition and Leader of the Conservative Party
Rt. Hon. Michael Ancram QC MP – Deputy Leader of the Conservative Party and Shadow Foreign Secretary
Rt. Hon. Oliver Letwin MP – Shadow Chancellor of the Exchequer
Rt. Hon. David Davis MP – Shadow Home Secretary
Dr. Liam Fox MP and Rt. Hon. Maurice Saatchi, Lord Saatchi – Chairman of the Conservative Party
Tim Yeo MP – Shadow Secretary of State for Public Services, Education and Health
Rt. Hon. Theresa May MP – Shadow Secretary of State for Environment and Transport
Rt. Hon. Thomas Galbraith, Lord Strathclyde PC – Shadow Leader of the House of Lords
Caroline Spelman MP  – Shadow Secretary of State for Local and Devolved Government Affairs
David Willetts MP – Head of policy co-ordination and Shadow Secretary of State for Work and Pensions
Rt. Hon. David Maclean MP – Opposition Chief Whip

Junior Shadow Ministers
Hon. Nicholas Soames MP – Shadow Secretary of State for Defence
John Bercow MP – Shadow Secretary of State for International Development
Rt. Hon. James Arbuthnot MP – Shadow Secretary of State for Trade
Howard Flight MP – Shadow Chief Secretary to the Treasury
Stephen O'Brien MP – Shadow Secretary of State for Industry
Dominic Grieve MP – Attorney General
Tim Collins CBE MP – Shadow Secretary of State for Education and Skills
Eric Pickles MP – Shadow Secretary of State for Local Government
Alan Duncan MP – Shadow Secretary of State for Constitutional Affairs
Julie Kirkbride MP – Secretary of State for Culture, Media and Sport
Andrew Lansley MP – Shadow Secretary of State for Health
Richard Ottaway MP – Shadow Secretary of State for the Environment
Andrew Tyrie MP – Shadow Paymaster General
Eleanor Laing MP – Shadow Minister for Women
Damian Green MP – Shadow Secretary of State for Transport
John Whittingdale MP – Shadow Secretary of State for Agriculture, Fisheries and Food
Oliver Heald MP – Shadow Leader of the House of Commons
Hon. Bernard Jenkin MP – Shadow Secretary of State for the Regions
David Lidington MP – Shadow Secretary of State for Northern Ireland
Bill Wiggin MP – Shadow Secretary of State for Wales
Peter Duncan MP – Shadow Secretary of State for Scotland
Christopher Prout, Lord Kingsland QC – Shadow Lord Chancellor

Shadow Cabinet (14 June 2004 – 6 May 2005)
Rt. Hon. Michael Howard QC MP – Leader of Her Majesty's Loyal Opposition and Leader of the Conservative Party
Rt. Hon. Michael Ancram QC MP – Deputy Leader of the Conservative Party and Shadow Foreign Secretary
Rt. Hon. Oliver Letwin MP – Shadow Chancellor of the Exchequer
Rt. Hon. David Davis MP – Shadow Home Secretary
Dr. Liam Fox MP and Rt. Hon. Maurice Saatchi, Lord Saatchi – Chairman of the Conservative Party
Tim Yeo MP – Shadow Secretary of State for Environment and Transport
Rt. Hon. Theresa May MP – Shadow Secretary of State for the Family
Rt. Hon. Thomas Galbraith, Lord Strathclyde PC – Shadow Leader of the House of Lords
Caroline Spelman MP – Shadow Secretary of State for Local and Devolved Government Affairs
David Willetts MP – Shadow Secretary of State for Work and Pensions and Welfare Reform
Rt. Hon. John Redwood MP – Shadow Secretary of State for Deregulation
Andrew Lansley MP – Shadow Secretary of State for Health
Tim Collins CBE MP – Shadow Secretary of State for Education and Skills
Rt. Hon. David Maclean MP – Opposition Chief Whip

Junior Shadow Ministers
Hon. Nicholas Soames MP – Shadow Secretary of State for Defence
Rt. Hon. James Arbuthnot MP – Shadow Secretary of State for Trade
George Osborne MP – Shadow Chief Secretary to the Treasury
Stephen O'Brien MP – Shadow Secretary of State for Industry
Dominic Grieve MP – Shadow Attorney General
Eric Pickles MP – Shadow Secretary of State for Local Government
Alan Duncan MP – Shadow Secretary of State for International Development
Andrew Tyrie MP – Shadow Paymaster General
Eleanor Laing MP – Shadow Minister for Women
James Paice – Shadow Secretary of State for Agriculture, Fisheries and Food
John Whittingdale MP – Shadow Secretary of State for Culture, Media and Sport
Oliver Heald MP – Shadow Leader of the House of Commons and Shadow Secretary of State for Constitutional Affairs
Hon. Bernard Jenkin MP – Shadow Secretary of State for the Regions
David Lidington MP – Shadow Secretary of State for Northern Ireland
Bill Wiggin MP – Shadow Secretary of State for Wales
Peter Duncan MP – Shadow Secretary of State for Scotland
David Cameron MP – Head of policy co-ordination
Christopher Prout, Lord Kingsland QC – Shadow Lord Chancellor

Shadow Cabinet (6 May 2005 – 5 December 2005)

External links
Conservative Party – Shadow Cabinet
Conservative front bench BBC News

2003 establishments in the United Kingdom
2004 in British politics
2005 in British politics
Conservative Party (UK)-related lists
Official Opposition (United Kingdom)
2005 disestablishments in the United Kingdom
British shadow cabinets